Samuel Kirkbride Robbins (May 9, 1853 – December 26, 1926) was a Republican Party politician who served as Speaker of the New Jersey General Assembly and President of the New Jersey Senate.

Biography
Robbins was born in Mount Holly Township, New Jersey, in 1853, the son of Barzillai W. Robbins and Anne Wilson, his wife. He was educated at Fort Edward Institute in Fort Edward, New York and at Andalusia College in Andalusia, Pennsylvania. He entered Princeton College, graduating with a Bachelor of Arts degree in 1874 and a Master of Arts degree in 1877. After reading law, was admitted to the New Jersey Bar in 1880. Later that year he opened law offices in Moorestown, and Camden.

On October 4, 1882, he married Edith E. Shreve of Pemberton. They had two daughters: Agnes Murrell Robbins and Edith Coate Robbins.

In 1897, Robbins was elected to the Board of Education of Chester Township (now Moorestown Township) in Burlington County, serving until 1903. He served on the Burlington County Board of Election from 1900 to 1903. He was elected to the New Jersey General Assembly as a Republican in 1903, serving until 1906. He was chosen as Speaker of the Assembly in 1906.

In 1906 he was elected to the New Jersey Senate, serving until 1909. He was selected Senate President in 1909. On the last day of the 1909 legislative session he was appointed by Governor John Franklin Fort to be Clerk of the Court of  Chancery (an office now known as Clerk of the Superior Court), following the resignation of Vivian M. Lewis. He resigned from the Senate and his nomination was confirmed.

Robbins served as Clerk of the Court of  Chancery until 1914. On December 6, 1926, he died from a heart attack at the age of 73 at his home in Moorestown Township, and was to be buried at his birthplace in Mount Holly Township.

References

External links
 Samuel K. Robbins at The Political Graveyard
"Minute as to the death of Samuel Kirkbride Robbins" by William D. Lipponcott and V. Claude Palmer

1853 births
1926 deaths
People from Mount Holly, New Jersey
People from Moorestown, New Jersey
Princeton University alumni
New Jersey lawyers
Speakers of the New Jersey General Assembly
Republican Party members of the New Jersey General Assembly
Republican Party New Jersey state senators
Presidents of the New Jersey Senate
People from Fort Edward, New York
School board members in New Jersey
American lawyers admitted to the practice of law by reading law
19th-century American lawyers